Nicu Țărnă (born 25 July 1977) is a singer, actor, showman and TV presenter from Moldova. He is the lead vocalist for the alternative rock band Gândul Mâței.

Biography
Țărnă was born on 25 July 1977 in Chișinău, Moldova. He graduated Moldovan Academy of Music, Theatre and Arts. On 20 June 2013 he married Cristina Cojocaru, an expert at Moldovan National Anticorruption Center.

Since 2013 summer, he is one of three judges of show Moldova are talent (Moldovan version of Got Talent).

References

External links 

 Profile at Facebook
 Biography  at VIP Magazin

1977 births
Living people
Moldovan rock musicians
20th-century Moldovan male singers
Musicians from Chișinău
Moldovan television presenters
Television people from Chișinău
21st-century Moldovan male singers
Romanian people of Moldovan descent